The Gloster Meteor is a twin-engined jet fighter, the first jet aircraft to serve with the RAF and the only Allied jet aircraft to reach combat in World War II.  Almost 4,000 were produced, mostly in service with the RAF between 1944 and 1965.  Meteors also served with the Royal Australian Air Force (RAAF), whose aircraft saw action in the Korean War; other users included the  Argentinian, Brazilian, Belgian, Danish, Dutch, Ecuadorian, French and Israeli air forces.  Many are preserved but only five are airworthy.

Argentina

The first export order for Meteors came from Argentina, which received 100 F.4s.  The first 50 were ex-RAF, the second 50 new. The Fuerza Aérea Argentina (FAA) identified aircraft with a number which remained the same throughout the life of the airframe, preceded by a letter indicating the role.  From purchase in the late 1940s to about 1963 the Meteors were used as interceptors, letter I, and hence serialled e.g. I-025.  After that, they were deployed as fighter bombers, letter C, and the same aircraft exampled before became C-025.  A few, rebuilt aircraft did change number.

Stored or under restoration
 Meteor F.4 I-029, ex-EE537, being restored for the Museo Regional Interfuerzas, Santa Romana, San Luis.
On display
 Meteor F.4 I-002, ex RA386, displayed on plinth in Merlo, Buenos Aires. Painted as C-051.
 Meteor F.4 I-005, ex-RA390, displayed on plinth, Museum of Independence, Tandil, Buenos Aires.
 Meteor F.4 I-010, ex-RA393, School of Education (ENET no.4), Quilmes, Buenos Aires. Used as teaching aid.
 Meteor F.4 I-014, ex-EE575, displayed on plinth in Goya, Corrientes.
 Meteor F.4 I-019, ex-EE553, displayed on plinth at the Northern Roundabout of the Avenue Spinetto Santa Rosa, La Pampa. Painted as I-021, condition poor.
 Meteor F.4 I-025, ex-EE532, displayed on plinth on the Avenue of the Air Force, outside the Escuela de Aviación Militar,  Córdoba.
 Meteor F.4 I-027, ex-EE527, Museo Regional Interfuerzas, Santa Romana, San Luis. It is the oldest Meteor airframe surviving anywhere, for the first 8 prototypes DG202-9/G, the first of which is preserved in the UK, did not bear the name.
 Meteor F.4 I-031, ex-EE588, Liceo Aeronáutico Militar de Funes, Funes, Santa Fe. Ogden locates this aircraft at the Aeroclub Las Parerjas, Las Parjas.
 Meteor F.4 I-038, ex-EE587, Junin Aeroclub, Junin, Buenos Aires.
 Meteor F.4 I-041, ex-EE586, Museo Nacional de Aeronáutica de Argentina, Morón, Buenos Aires.
 Meteor F.4 C-051, painted as C-002, Aeroclub Baradero, Baradero.
 Meteor F.4 I-057, displayed on plinth Loreto, Santiago del Estero. Ogden locates this aircraft at the Monumento de la VI Brigada Tandil, Buenos Aires. The earliest surviving Argentine built aircraft.
 Meteor F.4 I-071, painted as C-073, Collectión de la Escuela de Educación Téchnica 8 Jorge Newbery, San Justo, Buenos Aires.
 Meteor F.4 I-073, gate guardian (on tower to the left) at Mar del Plata Air Base.  Painted as C-071.
 Meteor F.4 I-084, Resistencia, Chaco.
 Meteor F.4 I-088, Aeroclub Chivilcoy, Chivilcoy, Buenos Aires.
 Meteor F.4 I-090, displayed on plinth, Plaza Batalla de Salta, Salta City.
 Meteor F.4 I-093, gate guardian on plinth, VII Brigada Aerea, Jose C. Paz, Buenos Aires. Painted as C-099.
 Meteor F.4 I-094, Grupo de Vigilancia, Merlo, Buenos Aires.
 Meteor F.4 I-095, gate guardian on plinth, Edificio Condor, Buenos Aires.
 Meteor F.4 I-099, on plinth at Presidente Perón International Airport, Neuquen.

Australia

Airworthy
 Meteor F.8 VH-MBX, ex-RAF VZ467,  exported to the Temora Aviation Museum in 2001. Painted as A77-851,  flown in Korea by Sgt. George Hale of 77 Squadron. Ownership was transferred to the Royal Australian Air Force in July 2019 and it is operated by the Air Force Heritage Squadron (Temora Historic Flight).

On display
 Meteor F.3 A77-1, ex-EE427, Australian National Heritage Centre Winnellie, Northern Territory.
 Meteor T.7 A77-701, originally A77-229, ex-WA731, Lions Cub Park Missile Museum, Woomera, South Australia.
 Meteor T.7 A77-702, originally A77-30, ex-WA732, RAAF Museum, Point Cook VIC.
 Meteor T.7 A77-705, ex-WA680, RAAF Museum, Point Cook VIC.
 Meteor T.7 A77-707, ex-WA118, Australian National Aviation Museum, Moorabbin Airport VIC.
 Meteor F.8 WE925, Bankstown, NSW. ex East Midlands Aeropark, Wales Aircraft Museum.
 Meteor F.8 A77-368, ex-WA952, Anzac Hall, Australian War Memorial, Canberra.
 Meteor F.8  A77-851 ex-WK653, South Australian Aviation Museum, Port Adelaide.  Central and forward fuselage only.
 Meteor F.8 A77-867, ex-WK685, Classic Jets Fighter Museum, Parafield Airport nr. Adelaide
 Meteor F.8 A77-868, ex-WK674, Camden Museum of Aviation, NSW, Australia 
 Meteor F.8 A77-870, ex-WK748, RAAF Museum, Point Cook, VIC.
 Meteor F.8 A77-871, ex-WK791, RAAF Forrest Hill, Wagga Wagga, NSW.
 Meteor F.8 A77-874, ex-WK909,  RAAF Forrest Hill, Wagga Wagga, NSW.
 Meteor F.8 A77-875, ex-WK798, painted as A77-385, Fighter World, RAAF Base Williamtown NSW.
 Meter TT.8 WA880, painted as A77-721 (no Australian history).
 Meteor TT.20 WD647, Queensland Air Museum, Caloundra, Queensland.

Belgium

The Belgian Air Force had 48 Meteor F.4s, 42 T.7s and, later 240 F.8s.

On display
 Meteor F.8 EG-18, Musée International de la Base Aérienne de Chièvres, Chièvres.
 Meteor F.8 EG-79, painted as EG-*), 1st wing Historical Center, Beauvechain, Belgium. Built under licence in the Netherlands by Fokker.
 Meteor F.8 EG-162, Musée dela Citadelle, Dinant. Built under licence in the Netherlands by Fokker and assembled in Belgium by Avions Fairey.
 Meteor F.8 EG-224, Musée Royal de l'Armée, Brussels. Built in Belgium by Avions Fairey with parts provided by Glosters.
 Meteor NF.11 NF-11-3, French Armée de l'Air, ex-WM298, Musée Royal de l'Armée, Brussels.

Brazil

The Brazilian Air Force received 10 Meteor T.7s and 60 F.8s.

On display
 Meteor T.7 4300 ex-WS142, Museu Aeroespacial (MUSAL), Campo dos Afonsos, Rio de Janeiro.
 Meteor T.7 4308 ex-WS150, Manaus Air Museum.
 Meteor T.7 4309 ex-WS151, Museu Aeroespacial (MUSAL), Campo dos Afonsos, Rio de Janeiro.
 Meteor F.8 4004, gate guardian Salvador-International/Deputado Luis Eduardo Magalhaes, Salvador.
 Meteor T.8 4399 painted as4460, Museu Aeroespacial (MUSAL), Campo dos Afonsos, Rio de Janeiro.
 Meteor F.8 4401, left off the approach to AMAN, Resende, Rio de Janeiro. The second of the F.8s.
 Meteor F.8 4406, Cleccao da Escuela Prepatoria de Cadetes do Ar, Barbacena.
 Meteor F.8 4409, Museu Eduardo André Matarazzo, Bebedouro, São Paulo.
 Meteor F.8 4411, Monumento de Goiania.
 Meteor F.8 4413, Colecao da Academia da Forca Aérea, Pirassununga, São Paulo.
 Meteor F.8 4430, on plinth at Santa Cruz Air Force Base (BASC), Rio de Janeiro.
 Meteor F.8 4433, Canoas Air Base (BACO), R. Augusto Severo, Canoas.
 Meteor T.8 4438, Museu Aeroespacial (MUSAL), Campo dos Afonsos, Rio de Janeiro.
 Meteor F.8 4439, on a pylon in the Praça do Avião, Canoas, Rio Grande do Sul.
 Meteor F.8 4440, Museu Asas de um Sonho, São Carlos.
 Meteor F.8 4441, Santa Cruz Air Force Base (BASC), Rio de Janeiro.
 Meteor F.8 4442, Museu Eduardo André Matarazzo, Bebedouro, São Paulo.
 Meteor F.8 4448, gate guardian to Canoas Air Base (BACO), R. Augusto Severo, Canoas.
 Meteor F.8 4452, CINDACTA II, Curitiba, Paraná. Displayed on the entry road to the complex.
 Meteor T.8 4453, Museu Aeroespacial (MUSAL), Campo dos Afonsos, Rio de Janeiro.
 Meteor F.8 4460,  ex-4399, Museu Aeroespacial (MUSAL), Campo dos Afonsos, Rio de Janeiro.

Czech Republic
On display
Meteor F.8 EG-247, Prague Aviation Museum, Kbely. Ex-Belgian Air Force, built in Belgium by Avions Fairey with parts provided by Glosters.

Denmark

The Royal Danish Air Force purchased 20 each of Meteors marks F.4, F.8 and NF.11, plus 9 T.7s.

On display
 Meteor F.4 43-461, Danmarks Flyvemuseum, Billund Airport
 Meteor T.4 43-469, Flyvestation Aalborg Samling, Vadum
 Meteor F.4 43-499,  Danmarks Flymuseum, Stauning.
 Meteor T.7 BT 265, Flyvestation Aalborg Samling, Aalborg Air Base|Vadum
 Meteor F.8 44-491, The Museum Royal Danish Air Force Station Karup, Karup Airport
 MeteorTT.20 51-504, The Defence and Garrison Museum, Aalborg.

Ecuador
The government ordered 12 ex-RAF FR.9s in 1954.

Meteor F.R.9,  Base Aérea Taura.
Meteor F.R.9 091, ex-WH540, Guayaquil Air Base.
Meteor F.R.9 FF-112, ex-WH547, Base Aérea Cotopaxi.
Meteor F.R.9 FF-114, ex-WB136, Base Aérea Cotopaxi.
Meteor F.R.9 FF-118, ex-WH549, Base Aérea Taura.
Meteor F.R.9 FF-123, ex-VW366, Air Force Museum, Quito.

France
 
L'Armée de l'Air had 32 ex-RAF meteor NF.11s delivered in the early 1950s.
On display
 Meteor T.7 F6, ex-WA607, Chateau Savigny-les-Beaune.
 Meteor NF.11 NF-11-1, ex-WM296, Musée Européen de la Chasse, Montelimar.
 Meteor NF.11 NF-11-5, ex-WM300, Musée de l'Air et de l'Espace, Paris le Bourget. Reserve collection.
 Meteor NF.11 NF-11-8, ex-WM303, Ailes Anciennes Toulouse. Toulouse.
 Meteor NF.11 NF-11-9, ex-WM304, Musée de l'Air et de l'Espace, Paris le Bourget. Reserve collection.
 Meteor NF.11 NF-11-15 Musée de l'Air et de l'Espace, Paris le Bourget. Reserve collection. Interesting nose.
 Meteor NF.11 NF-11-24, ex-WM382, Chateau Savigny-les-Beaune.
 Meteor NF.11 NF-11-747, ex-WS747, Musée de l'Air et de l'Espace, Paris le Bourget. Reserve collection.
 Meteor NF.11 SE-DCF, ex-WM-395, Chateau Savigny-les-Beaune.

Germany
On display
Meteor NF.11 NF-11-14, ex-WM348, French Armée de l'Air, Luftwaffenmuseum der Bundeswehr, Gatow, Berlin.

Israel

The Israeli Air Force received 4 Meteor T.7s, 12 F.8s, 7 FR.9s and 6 NF.13s.
On display
 Meteor T.7 marked 13, Ramat David Air Force Base Collection.
 Meteor T.7 marked 15, Israeli Air Force Museum, Hatzerim.
 Meteor T.7 marked 17, Rishon LeZion - Israeli Center for Sport Aviation.
 Meteor T.7 marked 18, ex-WL466, Israeli Air Force Museum, Hatzerim.
 Meteor T.7/8 marked 21, Israeli Air Force Museum, Hatzerim.
 Meteor T.8 marked 06, Israeli Air Force Museum, Hatzerim
 Meteor T.8 marked 40, Israeli Air Force Museum, Hatzerim
 Meteor FR.9, ex-WX975, marked 31, Ramat David Air Force Base Collection.
 Meteor FR.9, ex-WL259, marked 37, Israeli Air Force Museum, Hatzerim.
 Meteor NF.13, marked 119, Tel Nof AFB Collection.
 Meteor NF.13 4X-FND, ex-WM309, marked 50, Israeli Air Force Museum, Hatzerim.
 Meteor NF.13 4X-FNE, ex-WM320, marked 157, Israeli Air Force Museum, Hatzerim.
 Meteor NF.13 4X-FNB, ex-WM334, marked 51, Israeli Air Force Museum, Hatzerim.

Malta
Stored or under restoration
 Meteor T.7 WL360, Malta Aviation Museum workshops.

On display
 Malta NF.14 WS774, Malta Aviation Museum.
 Meteor F.8 WK914, Malta Aviation Museum (new arrival, ex-Mallom).  Painted as WK714, it has a FR.9 nose.

New Zealand
 Meteor TT.20 WD767, Classic Aircraft Collection - Dairy Flat, Silverdale, Auckland.
 Meteor F.8 A77-867, ex-WK685,  Ashburton Aviation Museum, Ashburton. After the Korean War joined the reformed Australian 77 Sqn. in December 1955.

The Netherlands
The Royal Netherlands Air Force received 65 Meteor F.4s, 43 T.7s and 160 F.8s.

Stored or under restoration
 Meteor T.7 I-19, ex-WH223, Militaire Luchtvaart Museum, Kamp Zeist, Soesterberg.
On display
 Meteor F.4 I-69, ex-VZ409, Militaire Luchtvaart Museum, Kamp Zeist, Soesterberg.
 Meteor T.7 I-320, ex-VW417, Vliegbasis Leeuwarden.
 Meteor F.8 3W-50, Lelystad Aviodrome Museum, Lelystad. Dutch Built.
 Meteor F.8 I-189, Militaire Luchtvaart Museum, Kamp Zeist, Soesterberg.

Sweden
Stored or under restoration
 Meteor T.7 SE-CAS, ex-WF833, Linköping Flygvapenmuseum, Linköping.
On display
 Meteor T.7, bought from Gloster by the Swedish Air Force as a Target Towing aircraft SE-DCC, was for year incorrectly painted as WS774 in museum. Ex-G-AMCJ originally Gloster's Ground Attack Fighter Demonstrator (Reaper) based on an F.8, later ex-G-ANSO used by Gloster for Air Photography before sale to Sweden. Now being restored at Svedinos Bil och Flygmuseum, Slöinge.

United Kingdom

Airworthy
 Meteor T.7 G-JWMA ex-WA638, used by Martin-Baker Ltd since 1952 to test ejection seats. Based at Chalgrove Airfield, near Watlington, Oxfordshire.
 Meteor T.7 G-JSMA ex-WL419, used by Martin-Baker Ltd since 1952 to test ejection seats. Based at Chalgrove Airfield, near Watlington, Oxfordshire.

Stored or under restoration
 Meteor T.7 WS103 of the Fleet Air Arm Museum's reserve collection is stored at Cobham Hall, Yeovilton, Somerset.
 Meteor NF.14 WS807 of the Jet Age Museum is stored at Gloucestershire Airport.
 Meteor TT.20 WM292 of the Fleet Air Arm Museum's reserve collection is stored at Cobham Hall, Yeovilton, Somerset.
 Meteor NF.11 WM167 of the Classic British Jets Collection is being restored to airworthy condition at Bruntingthorpe after making its last flight on 2 January 2019

On display

 F.9/40 DG202/G first prototype, RAF Museum Hendon.
 Meteor F.4 EE531, Midland Air Museum, Coventry Airport Baginton, Warwickshire.  Oldest Meteor in the UK; only the Argentine I-027, ex-EE527, is older.  The 8 prototypes DG202-9/G did not bear the name.
 Meteor F.4 EE549, Tangmere Military Aviation Museum, Chichester, W. Sussex. Set world absolute speed record of 616 mph (991 km/h) on 7 September 1946.
 Meteor T.7 VW453, Jet Age Museum, Staverton, Gloucestershire.
 Meteor T.7 VZ634, Newark Air Museum, Newark-on-Trent, Nottinghamshire.
 Meteor T.7 VZ638, Gatwick Aviation Museum, Charlwood, Surrey.
 Meteor T.7 (mod) WA634, RAF Museum Cosford, Shropshire.
 Meteor T.7 WA622, South Yorkshire Aircraft Museum, Doncaster, S. Yorkshire.
 Meteor T.7 WF825, Montrose Air Station Heritage Centre.
 Meteor T.7 WF784  Jet Age Museum, Staverton, Gloucestershire.
 Meteor T.7 WH132, RAF Leconfield, East Yorkshire.
 Meteor T.7 WH166, Birlingham, Worcestershire.  Private collection.
 Meteor T.7 WL332, Long Marston Airfield, Warwickshire.
 Meteor T.7 WL345, Cockpit/nose section is from WL360. Middlezoy Aerodrome/ RAF Westonzoyland, Somerset.
 Meteor T.7 WL375, Dumfries and Galloway Aviation Museum, Dumfries, Dumfries & Galloway, Scotland.
 Meteor T.7 WL405, Hooton Park, Cheshire.
 Meteor F.8 WA984, Tangmere Military Aviation Museum, Chichester, W. Sussex. Painted as WA829.
 Meteor F (TT).8 WF643, Norfolk and Suffolk Aviation Museum, Flixton, Suffolk.
 Meteor F.8 WH291, Speke Aerodrome Heritage Group, Crowne Plaza Liverpool John Lennon Airport Hotel, Merseyside />
 Meteor F.8 WH301, RAF Museum Hendon, London.
 Meteor F.8 WH364, Jet Age Museum, Staverton, Gloucestershire.
 Meteor F.8 WK654, City of Norwich Aviation Museum, Norwich Airport, Norfolk. Painted as WL135. 
 Meteor F.8 WK935, RAF Museum Cosford, Shropshire. The prone pilot Meteor.
 Meteor F.8 WK991, Imperial War Museum Duxford, Cambridgeshire.
 Meteor F.8 WL168, Yorkshire Air Museum, Elvington, North Yorkshire.  Painted as WK864.
 Meteor F.8 WL181, North East Aircraft Museum, Sunderland, Tyne & Wear. Repaint almost complete as of October 2010.
 Meteor FR.9 WZ608, Newark Air Museum, Newark-on-Trent, Nottinghamshire.
 Meteor NF.11 WD686, Muckleburgh Collection, Weybourne, Norfolk.
 Meteor NF.11 WD790, North East Aircraft Museum, Sunderland, Tyne & Wear; cockpit section only (open for access)
 Meteor NF.12 WS692, Newark Air Museum, Newark-on-Trent, Nottinghamshire.
 Meteor NF.13 4X-FNA, ex-Israeli (IDF-AF), previously mostly WM366, Lasham Aerodrome, Hampshire. Nose is from TT.20 WM234, rear fuselage from F.8 VZ462.
 Meteor NF.13 WM367 (cockpit section) on static display at East Midlands Aeropark
 Meteor NF.14 G-ARCX, National Museum of Flight, East Lothian, Scotland. Ex-WM261, Ferranti's radar development test-bed. NF.11 conversion.
 Meteor NF.14 WS726, Park Lane, Royton, Greater Manchester.
 Meteor NF.14 WS739, Newark Air Museum, Newark-on-Trent, Nottinghamshire.
 Meteor NF.14 WS760, Aeropark, East Midlands Airport, Castle Donington, Leicestershire.
 Meteor NF.14 WS776, Bournemouth Airport, Dorset.
 Meteor NF.14 WS788, Yorkshire Air Museum, Elvington, North Yorkshire.
 Meteor NF.14 WS792, Brighouse Caravan Park, Borgue, Dumfries & Galloway, Scotland.
 Meteor NF.14 WS832, Solway Aviation Museum, Carlisle Lake District Airport, Cumbria.
 Meteor NF.14 WS838, Midland Air Museum, Coventry Airport Baginton, Warwickshire.
 Meteor NF.14 WS843, RAF Museum Cosford, Shropshire.
 Meteor D.16 WH453, Bentwaters Cold War Museum, Suffolk. This aircraft is being restored to its original F.8 Configuration.
 Meteor D.16 WK800, Boscombe Down Aviation Collection, Wiltshire. Ex-F.8.
 Meteor TT.20 WD646, RAFManston History Museum, Manston Airport, Kent.  Painted as WD615.
 Meteor TT.20 WM224, Aeropark, East Midlands Airport, Castle Donington, Leicestershire.

United States

Airworthy
 Meteor T.7 N313Q, ex-G-BWMF, ex-WA591, Planes of Fame Air Museum, Chino, California
Under restoration
 Meteor F.4 N229VT, ex-VT229, Fantasy of Flight, Polk City, Florida.
On display
 Meteor F.4 VT260, Planes of Fame, Chino, California.
 Meteor NF.11/TT.20 WD592, Air Force Flight Test Center Museum, Edwards Air Force Base, California.
 Meteor T.7 WF877, Pima Air and Space Museum, Tucson, Arizona

References

Notes

Bibliography

External links

 Gloster Meteor site
  Brazilian Meteors on rudnei.cunha.nom.br
 List of ex-RAF Meteors on demobbed.org.uk
 T7 Meteor WA662 (complete under restoration) and F8 Meteor WL131 (cockpit) on aeroventure.org.uk

Gloster Meteor
Gloster Meteor